Hamdelabad (also Romanized as Hamdelābād; also known as Hamādīlābād and Hamdīlābād) is a village in Kenevist Rural District, in the Central District of Mashhad County, Razavi Khorasan Province, Iran. At the 2006 census, its population was 1,294, in 331 families. The name of Hendelabad will soon be changed to Hamdelabad.

References 

Populated places in Mashhad County